DeKalb Elementary is an 2017 American live-action short film directed by Reed Van Dyk and starring Tarra Riggs and Bo Mitchell. It was nominated for an Academy Award for Best Live Action Short Film at the 90th Academy Awards in 2018.

Premise
Based on an actual 911 phone call, a gunman enters an Atlanta, Georgia elementary school and encounters a compassionate employee.

Cast
 Shinelle Azoroh as Lakisha
 John Brockus as Detective Brooks
 Deloris Crenshaw as Miss Thompson
 Brie Eley as Miss Harris
 Jason Fracaro as Officer Gomez
 Sinora Glenn as Nurse Davis
 Del Hunter-White as Dee
 Lou Justice Johnson as Officer Jackson
 Levystein Lockett as Officer Williams
 Bo Mitchell as Steven Hall
 Peyton Perrin as Darius
 Lony'e Perrine as Miss Mitchell
 Champagne Powell as Devon
 Hansford Prince as Principal Flanagan
 Tarra Riggs as Cassandra Rice
 Tobie Windham as Agent Armel Parker

Reception

Critical reception
On review aggregator website Rotten Tomatoes, the film has an approval rating of 92% based on 12 reviews, and an average rating of 8.33/10.

Awards and nominations
 Nominated: Academy Award for Best Live Action Short Film
 Nominated: Student Emmy Award for Best Drama
 Nominated: BAFTA Student Film Awards

References

External links
 
 

2017 films
2017 short films
American drama short films
2017 drama films
2010s English-language films
2010s American films